Pachygnatha is a genus of long-jawed orb-weavers that was first described by Carl Jakob Sundevall in 1823.

Species
 it contains forty-two species and two subspecies:
Pachygnatha amurensis Strand, 1907 – Russia (Far East), China
Pachygnatha atromarginata Bosmans & Bosselaers, 1994 – Cameroon
Pachygnatha autumnalis Marx, 1884 – USA, Canada, Cuba
Pachygnatha bispiralis Nzigidahera & Jocqué, 2014 – Burundi
Pachygnatha bonneti Senglet, 1973 – Spain
Pachygnatha brevis Keyserling, 1884 – USA, Canada
Pachygnatha calusa Levi, 1980 – USA
Pachygnatha clercki Sundevall, 1823 (type) – North America, Europe, Caucasus, Russia (Europe to Far East), Central Asia, China, Korea, Japan
Pachygnatha clerckoides Wunderlich, 1985 – Albania, North Macedonia, Bulgaria, Russia (Europe)
Pachygnatha degeeri Sundevall, 1830 – Europe, Turkey, Caucasus, Russia (Europe to Far East), Iran, Central Asia, China
Pachygnatha d. dysdericolor Jocqué, 1977 – Morocco
Pachygnatha dorothea McCook, 1894 – USA, Canada
Pachygnatha fengzhen Zhu, Song & Zhang, 2003 – China
Pachygnatha furcillata Keyserling, 1884 – USA
Pachygnatha goedeli Bosmans & Bosselaers, 1994 – Cameroon
Pachygnatha hexatracheata Bosmans & Bosselaers, 1994 – Cameroon
Pachygnatha intermedia Nzigidahera & Jocqué, 2014 – Burundi
Pachygnatha jansseni Bosmans & Bosselaers, 1994 – Cameroon
Pachygnatha kiwuana Strand, 1913 – Congo
Pachygnatha leleupi Lawrence, 1952 – Cameroon, Congo, Malawi, Zimbabwe
Pachygnatha listeri Sundevall, 1830 – Europe, Turkey, Caucasus, Russia (Europe to Far East), Kazakhstan
Pachygnatha longipes Simon, 1894 – Madagascar
Pachygnatha monticola Baba & Tanikawa, 2018 – Japan
Pachygnatha mucronata Tullgren, 1910 – East Africa
Pachygnatha m. comorana Schmidt & Krause, 1993 – Comoros
Pachygnatha ochongipina Barrion & Litsinger, 1995 – Philippines
Pachygnatha okuensis Bosmans & Bosselaers, 1994 – Cameroon
Pachygnatha opdeweerdtae Bosmans & Bosselaers, 1994 – Cameroon
Pachygnatha palmquisti Tullgren, 1910 – Kenya, Tanzania
Pachygnatha procincta Bosmans & Bosselaers, 1994 – Cameroon, Burundi, Kenya
Pachygnatha quadrimaculata (Bösenberg & Strand, 1906) – Russia (Far East), China, Korea, Japan
Pachygnatha rotunda Saito, 1939 – Japan
Pachygnatha ruanda Strand, 1913 – Rwanda
Pachygnatha simoni Senglet, 1973 – Spain
Pachygnatha sundevalli Senglet, 1973 – Portugal, Spain
Pachygnatha tenera Karsch, 1879 – Russia (Far East), China, Korea, Japan
Pachygnatha terilis Thaler, 1991 – Switzerland, Austria, Italy
Pachygnatha tristriata C. L. Koch, 1845 – USA, Canada
Pachygnatha tullgreni Senglet, 1973 – Portugal
Pachygnatha ventricosa Nzigidahera & Jocqué, 2014 – Burundi
Pachygnatha vorax Thorell, 1895 – Myanmar
Pachygnatha xanthostoma C. L. Koch, 1845 – USA, Canada
Pachygnatha zappa Bosmans & Bosselaers, 1994 – Cameroon, Kenya, Malawi, South Africa
Pachygnatha zhui Zhu, Song & Zhang, 2003 – China

In synonymy:
P. gaoi Zhu, Song & Zhang, 2003 = Pachygnatha amurensis Strand, 1907
P. kuratai Levi, 1951 = Pachygnatha dorothea McCook, 1894
P. nipponica (Kishida, 1936) = Pachygnatha quadrimaculata (Bösenberg & Strand, 1906)
P. sewardi Chamberlin & Ivie, 1947 = Pachygnatha clercki Sundevall, 1823
P. yiliensis (Hu & Wu, 1985) = Pachygnatha degeeri Sundevall, 1830

See also
 List of Tetragnathidae species

References

Araneomorphae genera
Spiders of Africa
Spiders of Asia
Spiders of North America
Taxa named by Carl Jakob Sundevall
Tetragnathidae